George M. Frohmader (August 7, 1861 – September 19, 1948) was an American merchant and politician.

Born in the community of Rome, Jefferson County, Wisconsin, Frohmader went to Mauston High School to  Mauston, Wisconsin and lived on a farm. He taught school and worked at a general store. Frohmader owned a general merchandise business in Camp Douglas, Wisconsin. He served as president of the village of Camp Douglas, on the school board, and on the Juneau County Board of Supervisors. Frohmader was a Republican and served as postmaster for Camp Douglas. In 1917 and 1919, Frohmader served in the Wisconsin State Assembly. He died at his home in Camp Douglas, Wisconsin.

Notes

1861 births
1948 deaths
People from Sullivan, Wisconsin
People from Juneau County, Wisconsin
Businesspeople from Wisconsin
Mayors of places in Wisconsin
County supervisors in Wisconsin
School board members in Wisconsin
Wisconsin postmasters
Republican Party members of the Wisconsin State Assembly